A confidence man is a practitioner of confidence tricks.

Confidence Man may also refer to:
 "Confidence Man" (Lost), episode of television series 
 Confidence Man (album), by Matt Pryor
 The Confidence Man (film), 1924 silent film directed by Victor Heerman
 The Confidence-Man, novel by Herman Melville
 Confidence Man (band), an indie pop band
 "The Confidence Man", January 26, 2018 episode of Dirty Money (2018 TV series)
 Confidence Man: The Making of Donald Trump and the Breaking of America, a 2022 book about Donald Trump by Maggie Haberman

See also 
 The Confessions of Felix Krull, Confidence Man, a.k.a. Confessions of Felix Krull, unfinished novel by Thomas Mann
 Con man (disambiguation)